Walther Gerlach (1 August 1889 – 10 August 1979) was a German physicist who co-discovered, through laboratory experiment, spin quantization in a magnetic field, the Stern–Gerlach effect. The experiment was conceived by Otto Stern in 1921 and first successfully conducted by Gerlach in early 1922.

Education 
Gerlach was born in Biebrich, Hessen-Nassau,  German Empire, as son of Dr. med. Valentin Gerlach and his wife Marie Niederhaeuser.

He studied at the University of Tübingen from 1908, and received his doctorate in 1912, under Friedrich Paschen.  The subject of his dissertation was on the measurement of radiation. After obtaining his doctorate, he continued on as an assistant to Paschen, which he had been since 1911.  Gerlach completed his Habilitation at Tübingen in 1916, while serving during World War I.

Career 
From 1915 to 1918, during the war, Gerlach did service with the German Army.  He worked on wireless telegraphy at Jena under Max Wien.  He also served in the Artillerie-Prüfungskommission under Rudolf Ladenburg. 

Gerlach became a Privatdozent at the University of Tübingen in 1916.  A year later, he became a Privatdozent at the University of Göttingen.  From 1919 to 1920, he was the head of a physics laboratory of Farbenfabriken Elberfeld, later Bayer-Werke A.G.

In 1921, he became a.o. (extraordinary) professor at the Johann Wolfgang Goethe University of Frankfurt am Main. It was before 17. Feb. 1922 that Gerlach succeeded with the experiment on spin quantization in a magnetic field ("Richtungsquantelung"), which is commonly called the Stern–Gerlach experiment, having originally been proposed by Otto Stern and also making use of molecular beam methods developed by Stern. The experiment itself was carried out only by Gerlach, Stern by that time having left for a professorship in Rostock, in Frankfurt some time before 17. Feb 1922. On this day the "critical theorist" Wolfgang Pauli sent Gerlach a postcard with congratulations and the remark "Jetzt wird hoffentlich auch der ungläubige Stern von der Richtungsquantelung überzeugt sein" ("Hopefully the disbelieving Stern will now be convinced of the spin-theory"). The results were published jointly by Gerlach and Stern in 1922.

In 1925, Gerlach took a call and became an ordinarius professor at the University of Tübingen, successor to Friedrich Paschen.  In 1929, he took a call and became ordinarius professor at the Ludwig Maximilian University of Munich, successor to Wilhelm Wien.  He held this position until May 1945, when he was arrested by the American and British Armed Forces.

From 1937 until 1945, Gerlach was a member of the supervisory board of the Kaiser-Wilhelm-Gesellschaft (KWG).  After 1946, he continued to be an influential official in its successor organization after World War II, the Max-Planck-Gesellschaft (MPG).

On 1 January 1944, Gerlach officially became head of the physics section of the Reichsforschungsrat (RFR, Reich Research Council) and Bevollmächtigter (plenipotentiary) of nuclear physics, replacing Abraham Esau.  In April of that year, he founded the Reichsberichte für Physik, which were official reports appearing as supplements to the Physikalische Zeitschrift.

From May 1945, Gerlach was interned in France and Belgium by British and American Armed Forces under Operation Alsos.  From July of that year to January 1946, he was interned in England at Farm Hall under Operation Epsilon, which interned 10 German scientists who were thought to have participated in the development of atomic weapons.

Upon Gerlach's return to Germany in 1946, he became a visiting professor at the University of Bonn.  From 1948, he became an ordinarius professor of experimental physics and director of the physics department at the University of Munich, a position he held until 1957.  He was also rector of the university from 1948 to 1951.

From 1949 to 1951, Gerlach was the founding president of the Fraunhofer-Gesellschaft, which promotes applied sciences. From 1949 to 1961, he was the vice-president of the Deutsche Gemeinschaft zur Erhaltung und Förderung der Forschung (German Association for the Support and Advancement of Scientific Research); also known in short as the Deutsche Forschungs-Gemeinschaft (DFG), previously the Notgemeinschaft der Deutschen Wissenschaft.

In 1957, Gerlach was a co-signer of the Göttingen Manifesto, which was against rearming the Federal Republic of Germany with atomic weapons.

Other positions / Decorations / Honours 
From 1935 – Chairman of the committee to appoint a successor to Arnold Sommerfeld.
From 1939 – Member of the Comerlin working group on ship degaussing and torpedo physics.
From 1948 – a member of the Göttingen, Halle, and Munich Academies of Sciences.
Civil Class of the order Pour le Mérite.
1970 – Bundesverdienstkreuz mit Stern Order of Merit of the Federal Republic of Germany

Literature 
Walther Gerlach: Matter, Electricity, Energy: The Principles of Modern Atomistic and Experimental Results of Atomic Investigations (D. Van Nostrand, 1928)
Mac Hartmann and Walther Gerlach: Naturwissenschaftliche Erkenntnis und ihre Methoden (Springer, 1937)
Walther Gerlach: Die Quantentheorie. Max Planck sein Werk und seine Wirkung. Mit einer Bibliographie der Werke Max Plancks (Universität Bonn, 1948)
Walther Gerlach: Probleme der Atomenergie (Biederstein Verlag, 1948)
Walther Gerlach: Wesen und Bedeutung der Atomkraftwerke (Oldenbourg, 1955)
Walther Gerlach and Martha List: Johannes Kepler. Leben und Werk (Piper Verlag, München 1966)
Walther Gerlach (editor): Das Fischer Lexikon – Physik (Fischer Bücherei, 1969)
Walther Gerlach: Physik des täglichen Lebens – Eine Anleitung zu physikalischem Denken und zum Verständnis der physikalischen Entwicklung (Fischer Bücherei, 1971) 
Walther Gerlach (editor): Physik. Neuasugabe Unter Mitarbeit Von Prof. Dr. Josef Brandmüller (Fischer Taschenbuch Verlag, 1978) 
Walther Gerlach and Dietrich Hahn: Otto Hahn – Ein Forscherleben unserer Zeit (Wissenschaftliche Verlagsgesellschaft, WVG, Stuttgart 1984) 
Walther Gerlach and Martha List: Johannes Kepler : Der Begründer der modernen Astronomie München, (Piper Verlag GmbH, 1987)

Bibliography 

Walther Gerlach and Otto Stern Das magnetische Moment des Silberatoms, Zeitschrift für Physik Volume 9, Number 1, 353-355 (1922). The article was received on 1 April 1922.

See also 
List of German inventors and discoverers

Notes

References 

1889 births
1979 deaths
German nuclear physicists
German Army personnel of World War I
German people of World War II
People from Hesse-Nassau
University of Tübingen alumni
Academic staff of the University of Tübingen
Academic staff of the University of Göttingen
Academic staff of Goethe University Frankfurt
Academic staff of the University of Bonn
Academic staff of the Ludwig Maximilian University of Munich
Nuclear program of Nazi Germany
Knights Commander of the Order of Merit of the Federal Republic of Germany
Recipients of the Pour le Mérite (civil class)
Scientists from Frankfurt
Operation Epsilon
Presidents of the German Physical Society